is a 1965 Japanese drama and horror film directed by Shirō Toyoda.

Cast
 Tatsuya Nakadai as Iuemon Tamiya
 Mariko Okada as Oiwa
 Junko Ikeuchi as Osode
 Mayumi Ozora as Oume
 Keiko Awaji as Omaki
 Kanzaburo Nakamura as Gonbei Naosuke
 Yasushi Nagata as Samon Yotsuya
 Eitaro Ozawa as Kihei Ito
 Masao Mishima as Takuetsu

Production
Illusion of Blood was based on the kabuki play Tokaido Yotsuya kaidan by Nanboku Tsuruya, which had already been adapted to film before, including The Yotsuya Ghost Story I & II and The Yotsuya Ghost Story. This version of the film focuses on the increasing madness of the character of Iuemon Tamiya.

Release
Illusion of Blood was distributed theatrically in Japan by Toho on 25 July 1965 and in the United States as Illusion of Blood with English subtitles in March 1966.

Reception
In a contemporary review, "Dool." of  Variety referred to the film as a "blood-curdling Japanese ghost story", noting that the cast was "uniformly fine" and that "technical aspects, except for some abrupt cuts are first rate." A second review by "Mosk." of Variety compared the film to Kwaidan and Ugetsu, noting that Illusion of Blood lacked "classical rigor" or ""human insight and observation" that the other films had respectively. Mosk. added that the film did have "style, and good acting, excellent color and avoids violence and horror for its own sake."

A retrospective review by Cavett Binion of AllMovie found the film to be an inferior version of the film Kwaidan, opining that it was "not as visually commanding" but that it "has its share of nightmarish imagery and cultural richness."

References

External links
 

1965 films
Japanese drama films
Japanese horror films
Films scored by Toru Takemitsu
Films directed by Shirō Toyoda
Toho films
1960s Japanese films